Evergage was a cloud-based software that allows users to collect, analyze, and respond to user behavior on their websites and web applications in real-time.  In 2020, Evergage was acquired by Salesforce. It has been rebranded to Interaction Studio. The company positions itself as a "real-time personalization and customer data platform (CDP)."

The company was founded as Apptegic in 2010 by Karl Wirth and Greg Hinkle, who met while working at Red Hat. In May 2012, Evergage was a finalist in the TechCrunch Disrupt Startup Battlefield and shortly thereafter launched its cloud-based service.   In August, 2013, the company changed its name to Evergage.

In 2015, Evergage expanded its capabilities to include A/B and multivariate testing, as well as automated product and content recommendations driven by machine learning. The platform also added personalization support for mobile apps and, in 2016, open-time email personalization, and triggered email in 2017. Evergage acquired e-commerce and email personalization provider MyBuys in 2018.

See also
Software as a Service
Web analytics
Customer data platform

References 

Software companies based in Massachusetts
Web analytics
Cloud applications
Defunct software companies of the United States
Applications of artificial intelligence
Companies based in Massachusetts
2010 establishments in Massachusetts
Software companies established in 2010
American companies established in 2010
Salesforce